Jessica Reynolds (born 25 March 1998) is an Irish actress. She is known for her roles in My Left Nut, The Curse of Audrey Earnshaw and Outlander.

Education 
Reynolds studied acting at the Liverpool Institute for Performing Arts.

Career 
In 2019, Reynolds was cast as Audrey Earnshaw in the 2020 Canadian film The Curse of Audrey Earnshaw. Filming took place in Canada, resulting in her graduation from the Liverpool Institute for Performing Arts being postponed. Reynolds described the film as being "about a woman in society just trying to find her place the best she can in that moment."

In 2020, Reynolds starred as Rachael in the comedy series My Left Nut, which aired on BBC Three. The series was well-received by critics, with The Guardian saying that it was "equal parts charmingly funny and strangely sincere".

In March 2021, Reynolds was cast as Malva Christie in the sixth season of the Outlander TV series, alongside Mark Lewis Jones and Alexander Vlahos as Tom and Allan Christie, respectively. Reynolds said that Malva was "at the end of the day just a scared little girl who's been brought up by men and not been able to find her place."

On the stage, Reynolds has portrayed Beatrice in Much Ado About Nothing, Rachel in Second Person Narrative and Alais in The Lion in Winter.

Personal life 
Reynolds lives near Belfast.

Filmography

Film

Television

References

External links 
 
 

1998 births
Living people
21st-century Irish actresses
Irish film actresses
Irish television actresses
Actresses from Belfast
Alumni of the Liverpool Institute for Performing Arts